Tatton Old Hall is a historic building in Tatton Park near Knutsford, Cheshire, England.  It is designated by English Heritage as a Grade II* listed building which is owned by the National Trust and administered in conjunction with Cheshire East Council. It is also known as one of the most haunted houses in Britain and is home to The Haunted Hunts official haunted collection. Paranormal investigations take place on a monthly basis under the guidance of The Haunted Hunts team.  Its site is a Scheduled Ancient Monument.

History

The hall stands on a site near the village of Tatton, which has since disappeared.  It was built as a manor house around the start of the 15th century by either the Stanley family or Sir Richard Brereton. By 1585 a two-storey wing had been added at a right angle to the original house by Sir Thomas Egerton, Lord Chancellor of England. In the 1770s a new hall was built on the site of the present Tatton Hall and the old hall was used as a farmhouse and then a century later converted into three estate cottages.  It remained in the possession of the Egerton family until 1958 when it was given to the National Trust.

Architecture

The hall is built in red brick with a stone slate roof. It was originally timber-framed, but this was replaced by brick in the late 17th or early 18th century. The hall is L-shaped and externally appears to have two storeys. Internally the floors which were added to the older hall have been removed, exposing the complex wooden roof.  This has a carved wall plate, carved beams and three tiers of quatrefoil wind braces.  The hall contains a gallery which was added in the 20th century.  The newer wing retains its two floors and is divided into separate rooms.

Cruck barn

In the grounds of the hall is a cruck barn dating from the beginning of the 17th century which was originally in a farm at Frodsham, Cheshire. In a dilapidated state, it was removed from its original site in 1976 and rebuilt and restored at Tatton. The long walls of the barn are timber-framed with brick infill on a stone base and the short sides are in plain brick. The roof is thatched in Norfolk reed with sedge on the ridge. On the southeast front are two double doors and one single door; on the northwest front is one single door. Internally, cambered ties have been inserted between the crucks. The barn is listed at Grade II.

See also

Listed buildings in Tatton, Cheshire

References

Country houses in Cheshire
Tourist attractions in Cheshire
National Trust properties in Cheshire
Grade II* listed buildings in Cheshire
Grade II* listed houses
Scheduled monuments in Cheshire